Duttaphrynus olivaceus  is a species of toad in the family Bufonidae. It is found in southeastern Iran and western Pakistan. Its presence in Afghanistan and India is doubtful. Common names olive toad, Baluchistan coastal toad, Baluchestan coastal toad, and Makran toad have been coined for it.

Duttaphrynus olivaceus occurs in areas where water is available, such as irrigated land, springs, oases, and other types of wetlands at elevations below . Breeding takes place in ponds and oases. The surrounding habitat is mostly semi-desert with date palms.

Duttaphrynus olivaceus is an adaptable species that often depends on human-made habitats. It can be locally common. Pollution, habitat alteration, and droughts are localized threats.

References

olivaceus
Amphibians of Iran
Amphibians of Pakistan
Taxa named by William Thomas Blanford
Amphibians described in 1874
Taxonomy articles created by Polbot